Koyanovo (Quyan) is a rural locality (a village) in Kaleginsky Selsoviet, Kaltasinsky District, Bashkortostan, Russia. The population was 184 as of 2010. There is 1 street.

Geography 
Koyanovo is located 25 km northwest of Kaltasy (the district's administrative centre) by road. Kushnya is the nearest rural locality.

References 

Rural localities in Kaltasinsky District